Foa may refer to:

People 
 Arnoldo Foà (1916–2014), Italian film actor
 Barrett Foa (born 1977), American actor
 Edna B. Foa (born 1937), Israeli psychologist
 Emanuele Foà (1892–1949), Italian engineer
 Eugénie Foa (1796–1852), French writer
 Sylvana Foa (born 1977), American foreign correspondent
 Vittorio Foa (1910–2008), Italian politician, trade unionist, journalist and writer

Places 
 Foa, an island of Tonga
 La Foa, a commune in the South Province of New Caledonia

Other uses 
 Foa (fish), a genus of cardinalfishes
 Argentine Workers' Federation, now the Argentine Regional Workers' Federation
 FOA (trade union), Danish trade union
 Farmers' Organization Authority, in Malaysia
 Fields of Aplomb, an American metal band
 Field Operating Agency of the United States Air Force
 Filipinas Orient Airways, a defunct Philippine airline
 First office application
 First-order arithmetic
 Foreign Office Architects, a British architectural firm
 Formula One Administration, part of the Formula One Group
 Friends of Abe, an American support and networking group
 Friends of Animals, an American animal advocacy organization
 Front office appearance
 Foula Airfield, in Scotland
 Funding opportunity announcement
 Indiana Jones and the Fate of Atlantis, a computer game 
 Swedish National Defence Research Institute
 Father of All Motherfuckers, the thirteenth studio album by rock band Green Day